Weston Centre may refer to:

Buildings
Weston Centre (San Antonio) in San Antonio, Texas, USA
Weston Centre (Toronto) in Toronto, Ontario, Canada

See also
Weston Creek Centre, Australian Capital Territory
Weston Center, Connecticut, USA